The COVID-19 Response Recognition Award is a service award established by the New Zealand government in 2022 to recognise individuals and organisations who contributed to New Zealand’s frontline workforce COVID-19 response. The awards will be distributed from late January 2023, and it is expected that there will be about 80,000 individual recipients.

Awards to individuals will take the form of a lapel pin and certificate, designed and manufactured by Mayer and Toye of Wellington. People eligible to receive the award include those who worked for at least a month in total as part of the managed isolation and quarantine (MIQ) system, at the border, in COVID-19 testing, vaccination or contact tracing, or as medical staff caring for COVID-19 patients.

The organisational award, in the form of a digital certificate, will be awarded to organisations that contributed to New Zealand's COVID-19 response as part of the MIQ system, either as an active frontline organisation, a contracted supplier of services for MIQ, or an iwi partner or community group supporting people staying in MIQ facilities.

References

2023 in New Zealand
Civil awards and decorations of New Zealand
Response Recognition Award